Ameryst Alston (born 20 June 1995) is American professional basketball player. She played college basketball for Ohio State University before being selected by the New York Liberty in the 2016 WNBA draft where she played from 2016 to 2017.

High school career
Alston played for Canton McKinley High School in Canton, Ohio.

College career
After graduating from Canton McKinley, Alston played college basketball for Ohio State University from 2012 to 2016. She was a three-time All-Big Ten First Team selection and scored 2,165 points over her four year career.

Professional career
Alston was selected by the New York Liberty with the 24th pick in the 2016 WNBA draft and appeared in one game during the 2016 season before being waived when veteran Swin Cash re-signed with New York. She later signed with Spanish club Al-Qazeres Extremadura where she averaged 16.1 points, 3.1 rebounds and 2.6 assists per game during the 2016–2017 season.

In April 2018, Alston signed a training camp contract with the Chicago Sky. She was waived by the Sky a month later before the start of the season.

After playing in the SB League for BC Winterthur during the 2020–2021 season, Alston signed with reigning Icelandic champions Valur in August 2021. In 27 games, she averaged 26.0 points, 9.1 rebounds and league leading 6.6 assists per game.

In September 2022, Alston signed with Elazığ İl Özel İdarespor of the Turkish second-tier TKBL.

Reference

External links
Swiss statistics at swiss.basketball
Spanish statistics at lebplata.es
Ohio State Buckeyes bio
Icelandic statistics at Icelandic Basketball Association

1995 births
Living people
American women's basketball players
Basketball players from Ohio
New York Liberty draft picks
New York Liberty players
Ohio State Buckeyes women's basketball players
Point guards
Úrvalsdeild kvenna basketball players
Valur women's basketball players